Nerchinsky Zavod is a rural locality (a selo) and the administrative center of Nerchinsko-Zavodsky District of Zabaykalsky Krai, Russia, located near the Sino-Russian border. As of the 2010 Census, its population was 2,842.

History
It was founded in 1704 by Greek mining engineers in the employ of the Russian Government. Lead and silver ore was mined by prisoners in the Nerchinsk katorga starting in 1722.

Transportation
The regional road P429 leads west to Gazimursky Zavod, Shelopugino, and Sretensk; it leads east to the border with China at the selo of Olochi.

Climate
Nerchinsky Zavod has a subarctic climate (Köppen climate classification Dwc), with severely cold winters and warm summers. Precipitation is quite low but is somewhat higher from June to September than at other times of the year.

References

Notes

Sources

Rural localities in Zabaykalsky Krai
1704 establishments in Russia
Transbaikal Oblast
Populated places established in 1704